Brayan Eduardo Garnica Cortéz (born 27 May 1996) is a Mexican professional footballer who plays as a winger for Liga MX club Necaxa.

Club career
Garnica made his professional debut with Atlas on 30 September 2015, during a Liga MX draw with Cruz Azul.

Garnica made the move to Santos Laguna ahead of the 2019 Clausura season.

Honours
Atlas
Liga MX: Apertura 2021, Clausura 2022
Campeón de Campeones: 2022

References

External links
 

1996 births
Living people
Association football midfielders
Atlas F.C. footballers
Santos Laguna footballers
Liga MX players
Liga Premier de México players
Tercera División de México players
Footballers from the State of Mexico
Mexican footballers